Katherine Tupper "Kitty" Winn (born February 21, 1943) is an American actress. She is best known for her roles as the heroin addict Helen in the romantic drama The Panic in Needle Park (1971), for which she won the Best Actress award at the 1971 Cannes Film Festival, and her recurring role of Sharon Spencer in the horror film franchise The Exorcist.

Early life
Kitty Winn was born on February 21, 1943, in Washington, D.C., the daughter of Army officer James J. Winn (1907–1990) and Molly Pender Brown Winn (1912–1997). She had one brother. Winn traveled widely during much of her childhood, having spent time in the United States, England, Germany, China, India, and Japan. Her mother is the stepdaughter of U.S. General of the Army, former US Secretary of State, and former US Secretary of Defense George C. Marshall and daughter of Katherine Tupper Marshall.

Career
Winn's career has spanned a wide range of dramatic productions on stage, in motion pictures and on television. She studied acting at Centenary Junior College and Boston University, graduating from the latter in 1966. During her college years Winn acted in student productions at Centenary Junior College, Boston University, and Harvard College and summer stock for two summers at The Priscilla Beach Theatre, south of Boston. Shortly after college she joined the company at American Conservatory Theater in San Francisco, where she remained for four years under the artistic direction of William Ball.

In the fall of 1970 Winn left American Conservatory Theater to star opposite Al Pacino in the film The Panic in Needle Park, for which she won the Best Actress award at the 1971 Cannes Film Festival. Although she went on to do several more films, including They Might Be Giants (1971) and The Exorcist (1973), she spent most of her career in theater.

She played Cordelia in The Tragedy of King Lear for KCET in 1983, and soon retired from acting. She did not return to the stage again until 2011, when she played the lead in The Last Romance at the San Jose Repertory Theatre. For this performance, she was nominated for a best actress award by the San Francisco Bay Area Theatre Critics Circle.

Body of work

Theatre

Motion pictures

Movies for television

Series for television

Awards

Cannes Film Festival

References

External links 

 

1943 births
Living people
Actresses from Washington, D.C.
American stage actresses
Cannes Film Festival Award for Best Actress winners
21st-century American women
Centenary University alumni
Boston University alumni